One Blue Voice is a live concert video by the British singer Alison Moyet, released in 2005. It was filmed on 6 June 2005 at The Hospital Club in Covent Garden. The main feature contains 15 tracks, while DVD extras include four bonus tracks, an interview with Moyet and the promotional video for her 2003 single "More".

An audio-only edition of the entire One Blue Voice performance was included with the deluxe edition of Voice, released by Cooking Vinyl in 2015.

Reception
In a review of the 2015 deluxe edition of Voice, Paul Scott-Bates of Louder Than War commented: "[Moyet] flawlessly zips through much of the album in front of an audience clearly watching one of the finest live performances they may ever have witnessed."

Track listing

Personnel
Band
 Alison Moyet - vocals
 Steve Corley - keyboards, musical director
 Mark Cox - guitar
 Julian Cox - bass
 Bob Knight - drums
 Gita Langley, Nina Cockburn - violins, backing vocals
 Kotonto Sato - viola, backing vocals
 Llinos Richards - cello, backing vocals

Production
 Pete Glenister - concert sound mixing
 John Simmons - lighting director
 Matthew Longfellow - editor
 Tessa Watts - executive producer
 Martin R. Smith - director, producer
 Bill Smith - director of "More" promotional video
 Bill & Ben Productions - Alison Moyet "Voice" Interview
 Nick Fiveash, Owen Denham - still photography

References

External links
Alison Moyet's official website

Live video albums
2005 video albums